Acradenia is a genus of two species of tree or shrub in the family Rutaceae and is endemic to Australia. These plants have leaves that are trifoliate, arranged in opposite pairs and flowers that have five sepals, five petals and usually ten stamens of unequal lengths.

Description
Plants in the genus Acradenia are evergreen trees, sometimes shrubs with trifoliate leaves arranged in opposite pairs and lacking domatia. The flowers are arranged in panicles in leaf axils or on the ends of branchlets. The flowers are bisexual usually with five (rarely six) sepals and petals. The petals overlap at the base and there are twice as many stamens as petals, usually alternating in length. There are usually five carpels in each ovary and two ovules in each locule.

Taxonomy
The genus Acradenia was first formally described in 1853 by Richard Kippist in the Proceedings of the Linnean Society of London and the first species described was A. frankliniae.

The closest relative to Acradenia is Crossosperma from New Caledonia.

Species
Acradenia euodiiformis (F.Muell.) T.G.Hartley - yellow satinheart, bonewood (N.S.W., Qld.)
Acradenia frankliniae Milligan ex Kippist - whitey wood, wirewood (Tas.).

References

External links

 
Zanthoxyloideae genera
Sapindales of Australia
Taxa named by Richard Kippist